Shiva 143 is a 2022 Indian Kannada-language drama directed by Anil Kumar. The film stars Dheeren Ramkumar and Manvitha Kamath in pivotal roles. The music is composed by Arjun Janya. The film is produced by Jayanna, Bhogendra, and Dr. Suri under Jayanna Films banners. It mainly gained positive response.

Shiva 143 movie is a remake of the Telugu  movie RX 100.

Cast 
Dheeren Ramkumar as Shiva 
Manvitha Kamath as Madhu
Avinash as Narasimha, Madhu's Father
 Charan Raj as Appaji, Shiva's Adoptive Father
Shobaraj
Chikkanna as Chikka, Shiva's Friend
Bala Rajwadi
Sadhu Kokila
Puneeth Rudranag

Release
The film was released on 26 August 2022 in theatres. And it has started streaming on Amazon Prime Video on 23 September 2022.

References 

Indian drama films
2020s Kannada-language films
2022 films
Films shot in Karnataka
2022 drama films
Kannada remakes of Telugu films